Malpractice is a type of tort

Malpractice may also refer to:

Music
The Malpractice (band), a project of Danish songwriter Johannes Gammelby
Malpractice, a 1970s American band co-founded by GG Allin
Malpractice (Dr. Feelgood album), 1975
Malpractice (Redman album), 2001
"Malpractice", a song by Faith No More from Angel Dust, 1992

Other media
Malpractice (film), a 1989 Australian film
Malpractice, a 2001 film produced by Anita Gershman
"Malpractice" (short story), by Orson Scott Card